Ricardo Ticchi (born 1871, date of death unknown) was an Italian sports shooter. He competed at the 1920 Summer Olympics and 1924 Summer Olympics.

References

External links
 

1871 births
Year of death missing
Italian male sport shooters
Olympic shooters of Italy
Shooters at the 1920 Summer Olympics
Shooters at the 1924 Summer Olympics
Place of birth missing